The S-mount ciné lens mount was originally developed by Kodak.
It was a mixture of bayonet and threaded mount.
The S-mount was just used with a few Ciné-Kodak cameras, especially the Ciné-Kodak Special II from 1948-1961.

References 

Lens mounts
Film and video technology
Kodak